Mali Videm is a small settlement east of Šentlovrenc in the Municipality of Trebnje in Slovenia. The area is part of the historical region of Lower Carniola and is now included in the Southeast Slovenia Statistical Region.

References

External links
Mali Videm at Geopedia

Populated places in the Municipality of Trebnje